Afton Williamson (born September 7, 1984) is an American actress, best known for the lead role of Police Officer Talia Bishop in the ABC series The Rookie and as Assistant District Attorney Alison Medding in the Cinemax original series Banshee.

Early life
Williamson earned a Bachelor of Fine Arts degree from Eastern Michigan University and a Master of Fine Arts degree from the Alabama Shakespeare Festival.

Career
Williamson started as the understudy to Kerry Washington in the 2010 Broadway play Race before succeeding Washington in the role of Susan. Later she has made her television debut appearing in an episode of The Good Wife. Williamson later guest starred on Law & Order: Special Victims Unit, Blue Bloods, and Elementary. She had recurring roles on the CBS drama A Gifted Man from 2011 to 2012 as Autumn, and the first season of the television series Nashville as Makena. From 2014 to 2015, she had a regular role in the Cinemax network original series Banshee. In film, she made her debut in the 2011 drama Pariah.

In 2016, Williamson was cast in a leading role on the VH1 drama series The Breaks. She starred as Officer Wiggins in the 2016 HBO miniseries The Night Of.

In 2018, Williamson was cast in the ABC drama series The Rookie. In 2019, Williamson quit the show citing claims of racial discrimination, sexual harassment, and assault. TVLine had reported that Williamson, who portrayed Talia Bishop, would not be returning for the second season. While the outlet initially claimed that the split was amicable, Williamson, in a lengthy Instagram post, stated that she had left the series due to having "experienced racial discrimination/racially charged inappropriate comments from the hair department." Williamson also alleged that she was sexually harassed by guest star Demetrius Grosse, who portrays Kevin Wolfe in a recurring role, as well as an incident of bullying that escalated into sexual assault at a party; the head of the hair department was identified as Sallie Ciganovich. Williamson claimed that she had gone to the showrunners multiple times with these allegations, but was ignored.

All involved in the allegations denied them. An investigation was commissioned through the law firm Mitchell Sillerberg and Knupp along with a third-party firm, EXTTI, which conducted nearly 400 hours of interviews and examined video and other evidence. The results of the investigation were published on September 17, 2019, which found that the allegations made by Williamson had no merit, and could not be proven. Williamson stood by her claims, calling the results of the investigation "heartbreaking" and postulated that the producers had lied to cover up the truth of what happened.

Filmography

Film

Television

References

External links 

Living people
21st-century American actresses
American film actresses
American television actresses
Actresses from Toledo, Ohio
American stage actresses
African-American actresses
Eastern Michigan University alumni
1984 births
21st-century African-American women
21st-century African-American people
20th-century African-American people
20th-century African-American women